Payoff may refer to:
 Bribery, an act of implying money or gift giving that alters the behavior of the recipient
 A payoff dominant equilibrium in game theory
 Payoff matrix or payoff function in a normal-form game in game theory
 Payoff set in set theory
 Payoff (film), a 1991 TV film starring Keith Carradine
 Gomez & Tavarès (AKA Payoff) a 2003 film
 A word for slogan, used in some countries
 Pay off, to move away, fall off, or be pushed round by the wind
 Paying off, in British Commonwealth contexts, a practice originating in the age-of-sail of ending officers' commissions and of paying crew wages once a ship had completed its voyage; see Ship commissioning#Ship decommissioning
 Paying off pennant, flown in some navies when a ship is decommissioned; see Pennant (commissioning)

See also 
 The Payoff (disambiguation)